Stephen Victor Graham  (March 4, 1874 – September 2, 1955) was a United States Naval Rear Admiral and the governor of American Samoa from September 9, 1927, to August 2, 1929. Graham attended the United States Naval Academy and served on numerous ships before being posted to the governorship. As governor, he established a strong charter for the former Bank of American Samoa and reworked Samoan fiscal law. After his governorship, he worked at the Naval Academy as the head of the Modern Languages department.

Life

Early life
Graham was born on March 4, 1874, in Cass County, Michigan.

Naval career
Graham was appointed to the United States Naval Academy  from Michigan on May 19, 1890. He graduated July 1, 1896, and received the rank of lieutenant (junior grade) on July 1, 1899. Later in his career, as a lieutenant commander, Graham headed the Department of Modern Languages at the United States Naval Academy. After retiring, Graham was awarded the rank of rear admiral on March 3, 1931.

Governorship
On September 9, 1927, Graham became Governor of American Samoa. While in office, Graham rechartered the Bank of American Samoa and amended current fiscal laws for the island. He ceded the post to Gatewood Sanders Lincoln on August 2, 1929. Shortly after Captain Graham became governor, he received a letter from the Mau saying they would not pay any more taxes until a decision had been made regarding the “desire of the Samoa League for civil government.” Graham was invited to the Mau headquarters in Nu'uuli, where he told them not paying taxes would be an act of defiance. The Mau said they were not hostile to the Navy administration, but believed the time had come for a change. After governor Graham explained the “Samoa for Samoans” policy of the Navy, Mau members were so impressed and discontinued their taxation efforts.

Bibliography

References

1874 births
1955 deaths
United States Navy rear admirals
Governors of American Samoa
United States Naval Academy faculty
United States Naval Academy alumni
People from Cass County, Michigan
Military personnel from Michigan